Tegenaria argaeica is a funnel-web spider found in Bulgaria and Turkey.

See also 
 List of Agelenidae species

References

External links 

argaeica
Spiders of Europe
Arthropods of Turkey
Spiders described in 1905